Saint-Méloir-des-Bois is a commune in the Côtes-d'Armor department of Brittany in northwestern France.

Population

Inhabitants of Saint-Méloir-des-Bois are called méloriens in French.

See also
 Communes of the Côtes-d'Armor department

References

Communes of Côtes-d'Armor